Antaeotricha cicadella is a moth in the family Depressariidae. It was described by Sepp in 1830. It is found in the Guianas.

References

Moths described in 1830
cicadella
Moths of South America